Strontium chromate is a chemical compound, with the formula .

Preparation 
Strontium chromate is prepared from strontium chloride and sodium chromate, or from strontium carbonate and sodium dichromate.

Reactions 
Strontium chromate is approximately 30 times more soluble in water at 100 °C than at room temperature.  Therefore, the yellow strontium chromate can be suspended in a hot solution of a soluble sulfate to digest until fully converted to the much less soluble and white strontium sulfate, leaving the chromate or dichromate in solution.

Uses 
 Corrosion inhibitor in pigments
 In electrochemical processes to control sulphate concentration of solutions
 Colorant in polyvinyl chloride resins
 Pyrotechnics
 Aluminum flake coatings
 As an anti-corrosive primer for zinc, magnesium, aluminum, and alloys used in aircraft manufacture.
 As strontium yellow it was used in oil painting

References 

Chromates
Strontium compounds
Inorganic pigments